City Gallery may refer to:

 City Gallery (Hong Kong) 
 City Gallery (Leicester)
 City Gallery (Manhattan)
 City Gallery Wellington
 Singapore City Gallery